King's Theatre or Kings Theatre may refer to:

Theatres

Australia
 King's Theatre, Adelaide, South Australia (1911–1928)
 King's Theatre, Melbourne, Victoria (1908–1950s)
 Metropolis Fremantle, Western Australia, a performance venue and nightclub, formerly King's Theatre

United Kingdom
 Her Majesty's Theatre, London, England, known as King's Theatre 1714–1837
 King's Theatre, Edinburgh, Scotland
 King's Theatre, Glasgow, Scotland
 King's Theatre, Hammersmith, London, England
 Kings Theatre, Kilmarnock, Scotland
 Kings Theatre, Southsea, Portsmouth, England

Other countries
 Kings Theatre, now Mercury Theatre, Auckland, New Zealand
 Kings Theatre (Brooklyn), New York City, U.S.

Other uses
 King's Theatre (horse) (1991–2011), a racehorse